Parvaneh Massoumi (born March 2, 1945) is an Iranian actress. She has received various accolades, including two Crystal Simorghs.

References

External links
 

Iranian actresses
Iranian film actresses
Iranian television actresses
Crystal Simorgh for Best Actress winners
1945 births
Living people
Place of birth missing (living people)